Joshua 17 is the seventeenth chapter of the Book of Joshua in the Hebrew Bible or in the Old Testament of the Christian Bible. According to Jewish tradition  the book was attributed to the Joshua, with additions by the high priests Eleazar and Phinehas, but modern scholars view it as part of the Deuteronomistic History, which spans the books of Deuteronomy to 2 Kings, attributed to nationalistic and devotedly Yahwistic writers during the time of the reformer Judean king Josiah in 7th century BCE. This chapter records the allotment of land for the tribe of Joseph, especially the tribe of Manasseh, a part of a section comprising Joshua 13:1–21:45 about the Israelites allotting the land of Canaan.

Text
This chapter was originally written in the Hebrew language. It is divided into 18 verses.

Textual witnesses
Some early manuscripts containing the text of this chapter in Hebrew are of the Masoretic Text tradition, which includes the Codex Cairensis (895), Aleppo Codex (10th century), and Codex Leningradensis (1008). Fragments containing parts of this chapter in Hebrew were found among the Dead Sea Scrolls including 4Q48 (4QJosh; 100–50 BCE) with extant verses 1–5, 11–15.

Extant ancient manuscripts of a translation into Koine Greek known as the Septuagint (originally was made in the last few centuries BCE) include Codex Vaticanus (B; B; 4th century) and Codex Alexandrinus (A; A; 5th century).

Analysis

The narrative of Israelites allotting the land of Canaan comprising verses 13:1 to 21:45 of the Book of Joshua and has the following outline:

A. Preparations for Distributing the Land (13:1–14:15)
B. The Allotment for Judah (15:1–63)
C. The Allotment for Joseph (16:1–17:18)
1. Joseph's Allotment (16:1–4)
2. Ephraim's Inheritance (16:5–10)
3. Manasseh's Inheritance (17:1–13)
4. Additional Land for Joseph (17:14–18)
D. Land Distribution at Shiloh (18:1–19:51)
E. Levitical Distribution and Conclusion (20:1–21:45)

There are three key elements in the report of the allotments for the nine and a haf tribes in the land of Canaan as follows:

Allotment for Manasseh (17:1–13)

The tribe of Joseph is allotted with subdivision into Ephraim and Manasseh (Joshua 14:4), overall covering a huge area of land in Canaan between the Jordan River and the Mediterranean Sea from just north of the Dead Sea to Mount Carmel in the north-west, in addition to the Transjordan lands allotted the other half of Manasseh. The allotment for the tribe of Manasseh as a whole include the Transjordan territory (17:1–6), containing genealogical information closely related to Numbers 26:29–34. Machir and Gilead appear in Judges 5 (verses 14, 17), where Machir appears to occupy lands west of the Jordan, while Gilead has the eastern part of Jordan, with six clans named in the Book of Numbers. The story of Zelophehad's daughters concludes a narrative from Numbers 27, 36, that the right of inheritance for female descendants, to protect family property in the absence of male ones, was established by Moses, with a requirement that the daughters should marry within the tribe (Numbers 36). Now the provisions were respected, and the five daughters of Zelophehad, son of Hepher, along with the five Gileadite clans (in place of Hepher), making 'ten portions' (verse 5) within the territory of Manasseh in west of Jordan (the other sons of Gilead already received lands in east of Jordan). 
Western Manasseh's allotment stretches from the north, bordering the land of Asher, to Michmethath, on the border with the land of Ephraim to the south (verse 7, cf. 16:6). There were still enclaves of the Canaanites (verse 11–12, cf. Judges 1:27–28), that the people of Manasseh failed to expel, but put them as forced labor.

Verses 2–3

 And allotments were made to the rest of the people of Manasseh by their clans, Abiezer, Helek, Asriel, Shechem, Hepher, and Shemida. These were the male descendants of Manasseh the son of Joseph, by their clans.
 Now Zelophehad the son of Hepher, son of Gilead, son of Machir, son of Manasseh, had no sons, but only daughters, and these are the names of his daughters: Mahlah, Noah, Hoglah, Milcah, and Tirzah.
Of the eleven names (six sons of Gilead and five daughters of Zelophehad) six appear on ostraca (potsherds) found at Samaria, as place-names. These "Samaria Ostraca" were found in the site of king Ahab's palace, containing inscription written in the paleo-Hebrew alphabet, which is very similar to the Siloam Inscription.

Additional land for Joseph (17:14–18)
The request from the tribe of Joseph (that is, the tribes of Manasseh and Ephraim) for more land is accepted by Joshua on the basis of the tribe's large population, that 'they should clear the hill country of trees and make it habitable'. This is evidenced in the history of agricultural deforestation in the hill country. Actually, the sense of constriction in the tribe of Joseph is related to their inability to expel the Canaanites of the plain, who have iron chariots. Thus, Joshua challenged the tribe of Joseph (with their great numbers) that they must drive the Canaanites out in spite of their chariots.

See also

Related Bible parts: Numbers 26, Numbers 27, Numbers 36, Joshua 11, Joshua 14, Joshua 16

Notes

References

Sources

External links
 Jewish translations:
 Yehoshua - Joshua - Chapter 17 (Judaica Press). Hebrew text and English translation [with Rashi's commentary] at Chabad.org
 Christian translations:
 Online Bible at GospelHall.org (ESV, KJV, Darby, American Standard Version, Bible in Basic English)
 Joshua chapter 17. Bible Gateway

17